Gauthier Descloux is a Swiss professional ice hockey goaltender  who is currently playing with Genève-Servette HC of the National League (NL). He previously played with HC Ajoie of the Swiss League (SL) and with HC Ambrì-Piotta of the National League (NL).

Playing career
Descloux made his professional debut with Genève-Servette HC during the 2014–15 season. The next year he was loaned to HC Ajoie for most of the season, including the 2016 SL playoffs. Descloux posted a .936 save % during the playoffs with a 1.77 GAA to lead Ajoie to the Swiss League title. Descloux was loaned to HC Ambrì-Piotta to start the 2016/17 season. He played 16 games for the team, as well as 4 SL games with their affiliate, the Ticino Rockets. He again started the 2017/18 season on loan with Ambri-Piotta but was called back by Geneva at the start of the season to replace injured Robert Mayer.

On October 18, 2018, Descloux was signed to an early 3-year contract extension by Genève-Servette.

On February 3, 2021, Descloux agreed to an early four-year contract extension with Servette through the end of the 2025–26 season.

International play
Descloux made his debut with the Switzerland men's national team in November 2018 at the Deutschland Cup.

References

External links

1996 births
Living people
HC Ajoie players
HC Ambrì-Piotta players
Genève-Servette HC players
Swiss ice hockey goaltenders
HCB Ticino Rockets players
People from Fribourg
Sportspeople from the canton of Fribourg